Jung Hee-bong (born 17 March 1986) is a South Korean former footballer.

Career statistics

Club

Notes

References

1986 births
Living people
South Korean footballers
Association football forwards
Geylang International FC players
Gombak United FC players
Balestier Khalsa FC players
Singapore Premier League players
South Korean expatriate sportspeople in Singapore
Expatriate footballers in Singapore